Henderson, also known as Gainers Store, is an unincorporated community in Pike County, Alabama, United States.

History
Henderson was named for Eli Henderson, an early settler who moved to the area from Edgefield District, South Carolina. A post office operated under the name Gainers Store from 1830 to 1860 and under the name Henderson from 1860 to 1907.

Notable natives
Charles Henderson, the 35th Governor of Alabama from 1915 to 1919
Fox Henderson, businessman and banking entrepreneur
Jeremiah Augustus Henderson, businessman and captain in the Confederate States Army

References

Unincorporated communities in Pike County, Alabama
Unincorporated communities in Alabama